Picard is a surname meaning a person from Picardy, a historical region and cultural area of France.

People with the surname Picard 

 Alexandre R. Picard (1985–), French Canadian professional ice hockey defenseman
 Alexandre Picard (ice hockey) (1985–), French Canadian professional ice hockey wing
 Alfred Christopher Picard (1824–1855), New Zealand politician
 Andrew Comrie-Picard (1971–), Canadian race car driver and actor
 Auguste Piccard (1884–1962), Swiss physicist and balloonist
 Barbara Leonie Picard (1917–2011), British author
 Catherine Picard (1952–), French politician
 Colette Picard (1913–1999), French archaeologist
 Émile Picard (1856–1941), French mathematician
 Ernest Picard (1821–1877), French politician
 François Picard (disambiguation)
 Gilbert Charles-Picard (1913–1998), French historian and archaeologist, husband of Colette Picard
 Henry Picard (1906–1997), American golfer
 Irving Picard (born 1941), American lawyer known for his recovery of funds in the Madoff investment scandal
 Jean Picard, French bookbinder (active to 1547) commissioned by patrons such as Jean Grolier
 Jean Picard (1620–1682), French astronomer
 Jean Piccard (1884–1963), Swiss-American professor and balloonist
 Jean-Michel Picard (Antwerp, c. 1600 – Paris, 24 November 1682), a Flemish still life painter and art dealer
 Laurent Picard (1927–2012), French Canadian businessman
 Liza Picard (1927–2022), English historian
 Louis-Benoît Picard (1769–1828), French playwright
 Luc Picard (1961–), French Canadian actor and comedian
 Marc Picard (1955–), Canadian politician
 Marcelline Picard-Kanapé (1941–), Canadian educator and politician
 Michel Picard (1969–), French Canadian professional ice hockey wing
 Olivier Picard (1940–), French Hellenist, son of Colette and Gilbert (see above)
 Pauline Picard (1947–2009), French Canadian politician
 Robert G. Picard (1951–), American writer and scholar
 Robert Picard (1957–), French Canadian professional ice hockey defenseman
 Rosalind Picard (1962–), American electrical engineer and professor
 Timothée Picard (1975–), French music critic

Fictional characters
 Picard family, a fictional family in Star Trek, introduced in Star Trek: The Next Generation, see List of Star Trek characters (N–S)
 Jean-Luc Picard, fictional French captain in the Star Trek: The Next Generation TV series and films, portrayed by Patrick Stewart

See also
Piccardo
Piccard
Pickard
Pycard

References

French-language surnames
Ethnonymic surnames